In the Driver's Seat is the sixth studio album by Canadian country music artist Aaron Pritchett. It was released on November 9, 2010 by Decibel Records.

Track listing

References

2010 albums
Aaron Pritchett albums